The women's javelin throw event at the 2016 African Championships in Athletics was held on 25 June in Kings Park Stadium.

Results

References

2016 African Championships in Athletics
Javelin throw at the African Championships in Athletics
2016 in women's athletics